, formerly , is a Japanese talent agency, headquartered in Tokyo, Japan. The company is involved in various entertainment-related activities, including music, film and merchandise production.

History

AKS had managed the Japanese idol groups AKB48, SKE48, NMB48, HKT48, and NGT48, as well as the Japanese promotional activities of South Korean-Japanese idol group, Iz*One.

AKB48 employed a so-called "transfer system" for the first to tenth generation members, where members started out under AKS management and should receive a contract offer from other artist management companies after a predetermined period. Members in the next generations would be managed directly by AKS, although they could still accept offers to transfer to other agencies.

In 2016, ownership of NMB48 was transferred from Kyoraku Yoshimoto Holdings to AKS, putting all the 48 groups at the time under AKS's banner.

In 2019, the talent agency KeyHolder acquired SKE48 and placed it under the management of its subsidiary SKE, Inc., renamed in June to Zest, Inc.; AKS received a 20% stake in the subsidiary. It was also announced that Yasushi Akimoto is no longer part of AKS management and is only involved as the creative producer. In June, NMB48 was sold back to Kyoraku Yoshimoto Holdings.

In 2020, AKS was restructured into Vernalossom and transferred ownership of the three remaining Japanese idol groups to three independent business entities, while Vernalossom would retain control of the AKB48 sister groups outside Japan. AKB48 would be managed by DH, headed by Kazuki Uchimura, who is also the CEO of the AKB48 Group costume maker, Osare Company. HKT48 would be managed by Mercury and NGT48 by Flora, both of which are subsidiaries of the holding company Sproot, itself co-owned by Line Corporation, and the advertising company Piala. In May, it was announced that KeyHolder has also bought out Vernalossom's subsidiary North River, Inc., a transportation company which also owned 50% of Nogizaka46's management company.

Artists

Current artists

Units 
 JKT48
 BNK48
 MNL48
 AKB48 Team SH
 AKB48 Team TP
 CGM48

Talents 
 Shekinah Arzaga (MNL48)

Former artists 

 AKB48 (Transfer to DH, Co. Ltd.)
 SKE48 (Transfer to Keyholder/ZEST, Co. Ltd.)
NMB48 (Transfer to Kyoraku Yoshimoto, Co. Ltd.)
 HKT48 (Transfer to Mercury, Co.Ltd.)
 NGT48 (Transfer to Flora, Co.Ltd.)
 SDN48 (2010–2012)
 IZ*ONE (2018–2021, co-managed by Off The Record)
 Sakura Miyawaki (Transfer to A.M. Entertainment)
 Hitomi Honda (Transfer to DH, Co.Ltd.)
 DEL48 (2019-2020)
 SGO48 (2018–2021)
 Nako Yabuki

References

See also 
 

Japanese companies established in 2006
Mass media companies established in 2006
Entertainment companies established in 2006
AKB48
Film production companies of Japan
Japanese independent record labels
Japanese talent agencies
Mass media companies based in Tokyo
Music companies of Japan